The Stellantis Hurricane engine is a twin-turbocharged straight-six engine produced by Stellantis since November 2021 at their plant in Saltillo, Mexico and announced publicly in March 2022. The engine is designed for longitudinal applications and will fit their current vehicles that have a V6 or V8. It debuted with two versions, one of standard output (SO) and one of high output (HO), both featuring a start-stop system but designed for more extensive electrification in the future. Despite having common cylinder spacing and bore and stroke as the FCA Global Medium Engine, as well as valvetrain similarities, "less than 5% of content on the new Hurricane is shared with existing engines." The engine was developed at their technical center in Auburn Hills, Michigan over the course of three years. Stellantis expects the Hurricane engine to be the main internal combustion power plant for future vehicles using the STLA Large and STLA Frame in the North American market and is offering its use to other automobile manufacturers. The manufacturer claims the engine is up to 15 percent more efficient than larger engines and will be equipped in vehicles for sale sometime beginning in 2022.

References

Chrysler engines
Straight-six engines
Automobile engines
Gasoline engines by model
Stellantis